Juan Esteban Lazo Hernández (born 26 February 1944) is a Cuban politician who has been the President of the National Assembly of People's Power, Cuba's parliament, since 2013. Previously he was Vice-President of the Cuban Council of State. He is a member of the Politburo of the Communist Party of Cuba since 1980 and National Assembly of People's Power member since 1981.

On February 25, 2013, Lazo was named as the President of the National Assembly of People's Power.

Early life 
Lazo Hernández was born on 26 February 1944 in Jovellanos, Matanzas. He attended his neighborhood's elementary school up until 5th Grade, at which point he dropped out and began working with his family in the fields. He was 14 during the Triumph of the Revolution, and soon after he got a job at a rice mill. He continued to do jobs in the agricultural field until the age of 19.

References

External links
Biography by CIDOB (in Spanish)

1944 births
Living people
People from Matanzas Province
Communist Party of Cuba politicians
Presidents of the National Assembly of People's Power
Cuban revolutionaries
Government ministers of Cuba
People of the Cuban Revolution
Cuban people of African descent